

Events

January
  – São Paulo Metro Line 17 expected to start operation.
 – Jokeri light rail opening.
  – Taiwan Railways Administration is set to be incorporated.

March
  – Line 4 of Guadalajara light rail system opening.
 – Scheduled MRT Orange Line opening.

September
  – Caltrain is expected to begin electrified service along the San Francisco Peninsula.

November
 – Earliest date the Lynnwood Extension of Link light rail is expected to open from Northgate to Lynnwood in Snohomish County, Washington.

December
 – expected completion of Stuttgart–Wendlingen high-speed railway.
 – Planned completion of the García-Monterrey light rail link.
 – Grand Union scheduled to commence operating between London Paddington and Carmarten

Unknown date
 – The Cross River Rail line is planned to open in Brisbane, establishing a new tunnel crossing of the Brisbane River.
 – The Sydney Metro extension opening.
 – Opening of Stage 1 of the Parramatta Light Rail
 – Hurontario LRT opening.
 – The Lakeshore East line extension opening.
 – Confederation Line (Stage 2) East earliest opening date.
 – Airport Link Line in Shanghai opening.
 – Alexandria – Aswan HSL claimed opening.
  – Proposed completion of Tallinn-Tartu line electrification.
 – Tampere light rail extension to Lentävänniemi.
 – RER E extension to Mantes-la-Jolie.
 – Opening of Indore Metro.
 – Opening of Kanpur Metro.
 – Opening of Patna Metro.
 – Opening of the Tel Aviv Light Rail Green Line.
 – E8 series operation start. Speed of Yamagata Shinkansen trains (sharing 320 km/h Tohoku Shinkansen line) to increase from 275 km/h to 300 km/h.
  – Hokuriku Shinkansen extension.
 – Bandar Utama–Klang line opening.
 – George Town – Bayan Lepas LRT line opening.
 – Projected opening of the Auckland City Rail Link.
  – Moscow-Nizhny Novgorod line to be fully upgraded to high-speed rail.
 – Opening of Line 2 of Kazan Metro.
 – Extension of Stockholm Metro.
 – Expected completion of the Kaohsiung Rapid Transit Circular light rail.
 – Phuket Island light rail transit opening.
 – Projected opening of Coventry Very Light Rail.
 – Hydrogen trains introduction, the first train to be designated as Class 6xx.
 – Great British Railways to take over as owner of the UK rail network from Network Rail
 – Phoenix Valley Metro Rail South Central Extension/Downtown Hub project is expected to open to passenger operations as the second light rail line in the metro area.
 – Phoenix Valley Metro Rail Northwest Extension Phase II is planned to open.
 – Phoenix Valley Metro Rail Capitol/I-10 West Extension Phase I is planned to open to the Arizona State Capitol.
 – Planned completion of Brightline West between Las Vegas, Nevada and Victor Valley, California.
 – The MAX Red Line is planned to be extended to Fair Complex/Hillsboro Airport, completing a direct rail link from Hillsboro Airport to Portland International Airport.
 – Earliest expected start of Brightline commuter rail operations in Miami-Dade County along the Florida East Coast Railway.
  – Earliest expected year that Caltrain service in California is to be extended to Salinas.
 – Los Angeles Metro Rail Purple Line Extension Phase I is scheduled to open.
 – Dallas Silver Line commuter rail expected to open.
 – Line 2 of Seattle's Link light rail system is expected to begin service, connecting Downtown Seattle to Bellevue and Redmond. The train line will be the second service in the light rail system and first ever to cross a floating bridge.
 – Altamont Corridor Express service is expected to be extended to Ceres.
 – OC Streetcar is expected to begin service in Orange County, California.

References